Athletes from the Islamic Republic of Iran competed at the 2004 Summer Paralympics in Athens, Greece.

Competitors

Medal summary

Medal table

Medalists

Results by event

Archery

Men's recurve

Athletics

Men

Women

Cycling

Men's road

Men's track

Football 7-a-side

Men

Judo

Men

Powerlifting

Men

Shooting

Men

Women

Mixed

Table tennis

Men

Volleyball

Men's sitting

Wheelchair basketball

Men

References
International Paralympic Committee

Nations at the 2004 Summer Paralympics
2004
Paralympics